Harry Linley (born in Sheffield) was a professional footballer, who played for Huddersfield Town and Halifax Town.

References

Year of birth missing
Year of death missing
English footballers
Footballers from Sheffield
Association football midfielders
English Football League players
Huddersfield Town A.F.C. players
Halifax Town A.F.C. players